Leucadendron meridianum, the limestone conebush, is a flower-bearing shrub belonging to the genus Leucadendron and forms part of the fynbos. The plant is native to the Western Cape, South Africa.

Description
The plant dies in a fire but the seeds survive. The seeds are stored in a toll on the female plant and fall to the ground after a fire and are spread by the wind, the seeds have wings. The plant is unisexual and there are separate plants with male and female flowers, which are pollinated by small beetles.

Distribution and habitat
The plant occurs from the Cape Peninsula to Potberg and Riviersonderend in South Africa.

External links
Threatened Species Programme | SANBI Red List of South African Plants
Leucadendron meridianum (Limestone conebush)
Limestone Conebush

References

IUCN Red List near threatened species
meridianum